The 1937–38 season was Manchester City's 43rd season of competitive football and 31st season in the top division of English football. In addition to the First Division, the club competed in the FA Cup and the FA Charity Shield.

Second Division

League table

Results summary

References

External links

Manchester City F.C. seasons